Massepha ohbai is a moth in the family Crambidae. It was described by Yoshiyasu in 1990. It is found in Japan (Kyushu).

References

Moths described in 1990
Pyraustinae